In the United States Government, the Bureau of Administration is part of the U.S. Department of State.  The Bureau is responsible for administrative support operations, including procurement; supply and transportation; real property and facilities management; diplomatic pouch and mail services; official records, publishing, and library services; language services; setting allowance rates for U.S. Government personnel assigned abroad and providing support to the overseas schools educating their dependents; overseeing safety and occupational health matters; small and disadvantaged business utilization; and support for both White House travel abroad and special conferences called by the President or Secretary of State. It is headed by the Assistant Secretary of State for Administration.

Offices
Offices in the Bureau of Administration include the following:

 Office of the Assistant Secretary
 Office of the Executive Director
 Presidential Travel Support Division
 Office of the Procurement Executive
 Office of Acquisitions Policy
 Office of Acquisitions Management
 Office of Emergency Management
 Commissary and Recreation Affairs
 Office of Allowances
 Office of Language Services
 Office of Overseas Schools
 Office of Real Property Management
 Office of Facilities and Management Services
 Office of General Services Management
 Privacy Staff
 Office of Directives Management
 Office of Information Programs and Services
 Office of Global Publishing Solutions
 Office of Logistics Operations
 Office of Program Management and Policy
 Office of Small and Disadvantaged Business Utilization

References

External links
 U.S. Department of State Bureau of Administration official website

Administration